Pavel Yuryevich Gubarev (or Pavlo Yuriyovych Hubariev ; born 10 February 1983) is a Russian political figure and soldier who proclaimed himself the "People's Governor" of the Donetsk Region at the Regional Assembly on 3 March 2014, after separatists seized the building. Gubarev had earlier declared himself leader of the Donbas People's Militia. Since then, he has been sidelined by other separatist leaders and was banned from taking part in the 2014 Donbas parliamentary elections. These elections also eliminated the post of "People's Governor". Gubarev was not a figure in local politics prior to the beginning of the 2014 pro-Russian conflict in Ukraine.

Shortly after declaring himself "People's Governor" on 6 March 2014, Gubarev was arrested by the Security Service of Ukraine (SBU) for "advocating separatism" and "illegal seizure of power". He faced up to ten years in prison. On 7 May 2014, Gubarev was freed in exchange for SBU officers detained earlier by the Donbas People's Militia.

Early life
Gubarev gained a degree in history from the Donetsk National University, and later became an employee of a Donetsk advertising agency. In 2007, he founded and served as the company director of the "Morozko" company, which supplied hired Ded Moroz (Santa Claus) figures in the Donetsk area.

Career and activities
Gubarev was a member of the Progressive Socialist Party of Ukraine, a pro-Russian party based in the southeast of the country. According to an unnamed acquaintance, Gubarev advocates Pan-Slavism. In earlier years Gubarev was a member of the neo-Nazi Russian National Unity paramilitary group, that later took part in the War in Donbas on the side of pro-Russian forces. Gubarev has publicly given thanks to this group for providing him with military training. In the same interview he said he was not a radical nationalist and described himself as "centre-left".
 
On 1 March 2014, pro-Russian citizens at a meeting in Lenin Square in the center of Donetsk elected Gubarev as governor of the region.

From the beginning of the 2014 Crimean crisis, Gubarev led pro-Russian protesters who blockaded and occupied the Donetsk Regional State Administration building.

During a press-conference with journalists on 6 March 2014, Gubarev stated that his main goal as the self-proclaimed governor was to declare a referendum on the territorial status of Donetsk Oblast, non-recognition of the new Ukrainian government, and non-recognition of Donetsk governor Serhiy Taruta.

On 6 March 2014, the Security Service of Ukraine arrested Gubarev. Following his arrest, Gubarev was reportedly taken to Kyiv for detention. He was later charged with wanting to damage "the territorial integrity and independence of the state".

On 16 March, a crowd of protesters stormed government buildings in Donetsk demanding Gubarev's release.

On 7 May 2014, Gubarev and two other pro-Russian activists were freed in exchange for SBU officers, detained earlier by the Donbas People's Militia.

In October 2014, during a failed assassination attempt on him, Gubarev lost control of his car when it came under gunfire and suffered a head injury. He later regained consciousness and was moved from intensive care to the ordinary ward of the hospital.

Gubarev was excluded by the election commission from participating in the 2014 Donbas parliamentary elections "because his party was not able to hold a founding conference".

Early February 2016 Gubarev was appointed Yasynuvata Raion mayor by the Donetsk People's Republic.

Following the death of Alexander Zakharchenko, there were elections in the Donetsk People's Republic on 11 November 2018. In September 2018, Pavel Gubarev went to Moscow and obtained permission to be a candidate for the post of head of the Donetsk People's Republic. Gubarev and supporters collected 15,000 signatures for his nomination papers (the law only requires 10,000 signatures). Gubarev's candidacy displeased Denis Pushilin, who has taken over as head of the Donetsk People's Republic, and pressure has been put on Gubarev.

On 29 September 2018, Gubarev's wife, Ekaterina, was arrested and temporarily detained to prevent her attending the Free Donbas party convention so that she was excluded from the party list for the "elections" of the People's Council of the Donetsk People's Republic on 11 November. At the convention, the Free Donbas movement was taken over by supporters of Denis Pushilin.  After this incident Ekaterina Gubareva left for Rostov-on-Don.  In early October 2018, the electoral commission ruled that the signatures on Gubarev's nomination papers were invalid; the authorities in Russia often use this method to exclude candidates.

In 2022, Gubarev signed a short-term contract with the Russian Armed Forces, as a private, in order to participate in the Russian invasion of Ukraine. During his service there, he declared in an interview their goal to free from "possession" those who he considers to be Russians, even at the cost of killing them all, which would amount to genocide on Ukrainians.

References

External links

1983 births
Living people
People from Sievierodonetsk
Progressive Socialist Party of Ukraine politicians
Pro-Russian people of the 2014 pro-Russian unrest in Ukraine
Prisoners and detainees of Ukraine
Russian nationalists
People of the Donetsk People's Republic
Donetsk National University alumni
Pro-Russian people of the war in Donbas
People of Anti-Maidan
Heads of government who were later imprisoned
Ukrainian collaborators with Russia
Russian individuals subject to European Union sanctions
Individuals designated as terrorist by the government of Ukraine
Anti-Ukrainian sentiment in Ukraine